

Station List

W